The discography of Howling Bells, a London-based Australian indie rock band, consists of four studio albums, three extended plays, twelve singles, and thirteen music videos. Formed in Sydney in 2004, the group consists of Juanita Stein (vocals, rhythm guitar), Glenn Moule (drums), Juanita's brother Joel Stein (lead guitar), and Gary Daines (bass guitar). Original Howling Bells bass guitarist, Brendan Picchio, left the band in December 2011.

The band moved to London shortly after its formation and recorded its debut album with regular Coldplay producer, Ken Nelson. Following three singles, Howling Bells released their self-titled debut album Howling Bells (2006), to critical acclaim in the United Kingdom. It charted just inside the Top 100 in that country, and just outside the Top 50 in Australia. Four singles that were released from the album charted outside of the Top 100 in the UK. The band's second album Radio Wars (2009), received mixed reviews and failed to produce a charting single in any country, though the album itself charted higher than its more popular predecessor in both the UK and Australia. Howling Bells' third album The Loudest Engine (2011), was released to mostly positive reviews, but did not perform well on the charts. Their fourth album Heartstrings (2014), failed to chart in any nation.

Albums

Studio albums

Extended plays

Singles

Music videos

References

External links

Discographies of British artists